The St. Joseph Channel is a strait in Algoma District, Northwestern Ontario, Canada and Chippewa County, Michigan, United States. It is in the Great Lakes Basin and connects the St. Marys River flowing through the Middle Neebish Channel between Neebish Island and Sugar Island at the northwest and Lake George/ East Neebish Channel between Sugar Island and the Ontario mainland at the north, with the North Channel between St. Joseph Island and the Ontario mainland at the east, and with the Munuscong Channel between Neebish Island and St. Joseph Island at the southwest. All of these waterbody elements are part of Lake Huron.

References

Sources

Lake Huron
Landforms of Algoma District
Bodies of water of Chippewa County, Michigan
Straits of Michigan
Straits of Canada